Swift Burch (born May 8, 1969) is a former Canadian football defensive lineman in the Canadian Football League (CFL). He played for the Toronto Argonauts, Ottawa Rough Riders and Montreal Alouettes. Burch played college football at Temple.

References

1969 births
Living people
Players of American football from Washington, D.C.
American football defensive tackles
Canadian football defensive linemen
Temple Owls football players
Toronto Argonauts players
Ottawa Rough Riders players
Montreal Alouettes players